The Old Bed Eyre River is a river of the Canterbury region of New Zealand's South Island. It lies to the south of the Eyre River, into which it flows near Kaiapoi.

See also
List of rivers of New Zealand

References

Rivers of Canterbury, New Zealand
Rivers of New Zealand